"Thousands Are Sailing" is a song by The Pogues, released in 1988. 
The song is an Irish folk style ballad, written by Phil Chevron, and featured on The Pogues' album If I Should Fall from Grace with God.

Lyrics

The song consists of two 16-line verses, and three occurrences of a chorus that varies each time.

The song opens in the third-person voice, setting the song's place and tone: "The island, it is silent now...." The torch referred to is clearly that of the Statue of Liberty, and therefore "the island" is likely Ellis Island. The Ellis Island federal immigration station opened on 1 January 1892 and was closed in 1954, with twelve million immigrants processed there by the US Bureau of Immigration. The song continues, "...but the ghosts still haunt the waves..." These ghosts are the Irish immigrants who did not survive the long ship crossing to America and whose souls now "haunt the waves."

The first verse continues in the second-person voice, with a series of questions about post-immigration life, asked by a modern immigrant of an earlier one, first about employment ("upon the railroad"/as a police officer) and class ("the White House"/"the five and dime"), and then about homesickness. The older immigrant (a ghost, as his words reveal) answers that his voyage was on "a coffin ship," and thus, having died on the journey, he has no answers. According to historical documentation, there was a 30% mortality rate on these coffin ships, and their reference is a recurring theme in many Irish folk songs.  His response includes a reference to names being changed, another suggestion of Ellis Island, where Irish names were routinely anglicized.

The first chorus reverts to the third-person voice. It is the most optimistic of the three choruses, spoken from Ireland (the Atlantic is called "the western ocean") and calling America "a land of opportunity," where hunger and poverty are overcome. Even so, it includes a somber note, that "some of them will never see" America.

With the second verse, the voice moves to the first-person and remains so through the end of the song. The setting is contemporary, making references to Brendan Behan, George M. Cohan, 'Dear old Time Square's favourite bard', and "JFK" (John F. Kennedy). The speaker is in New York City with a companion, enjoying the relatively easier time of the modern immigrant. However, even here there is a dark note: "When I got back to my empty room, I suppose I must have cried."

The second chorus reveals why: "the hand of opportunity draws tickets in a lottery." The U.S.'s Immigration Reform and Control Act of 1986 imposed quotas on Irish immigrants, awarding "green cards" via a lottery system. The chorus continues, to describe the furtive life of the illegal immigrant: "from rooms the daylight never sees, where lights don't glow on Christmas trees."

The final chorus summarizes the conflicted psychology of the Irish emigrant ("where'er we go we celebrate the land that makes us refugees") and takes a parting shot at the Irish Catholic church: "from fear of priests with empty plates/ from guilt, and weeping effigies."

Recordings

 The Pogues, on If I Should Fall from Grace with God
 Philip Chevron, on the Bringing It All Back Home soundtrack
 Patrick Clifford, on American Wake

Legacy
"Thousands Are Sailing" was one of the inspirations for the graphic novel Gone to Amerikay, by Derek McCulloch and Colleen Doran.

The first seconds of the song appear as the main and repeating sample in the Berry Sakharof's song "White Noise" (Hebrew: רעש לבן, Raash Lavan) on his album "Signs of Weakness", 1993.

References

External links
 "Thousands Are Sailing" lyrics, at the official Pogues website.
 Annotations on songs from 'If I Should Fall From Grace With God,' including "Thousands Are Sailing."

1988 songs
The Pogues songs
Works about immigration to the United States
Songs about New York City
Songs about boats
Songs about islands
Song recordings produced by Steve Lillywhite